WKBH (1570 AM) is a radio station  broadcasting a Catholic talk radio format. Licensed to Holmen, Wisconsin, United States. The station is owned by Relevant Radio, Inc.

WKBH began broadcasting in 1984.

Station managers
 John Socha (2001 - 2006)

References

External links

KBH
Radio stations established in 1984
Relevant Radio stations
1984 establishments in Wisconsin